Travin Howard (born May 10, 1996) is an American football linebacker who is a free agent. He played college football at TCU.

Early years
Howard was born in Longview, Texas, where he became a star at Longview High School.  Playing safety, he earned District Defensive MVP honors as a senior for the Lobos in 2013. He verbally committed to play at TCU and signed his national letter of intent with the Horned Frogs on February 5, 2014.

College career
At TCU, Howard played sparingly as a freshman in 2014.  After the first game of his sophomore season, Howard was moved to Linebacker and led the Horned Frogs in tackles the next week against Stephen F. Austin.  He went on to start the next 11 games, and would end the season as the team's leading tackler.  He also earned Defensive MVP honors in the Frogs' triple-overtime victory over Oregon in the 2015 Alamo Bowl.

As a full-time starter in his junior and senior seasons in Fort Worth, Howard again led the Horned Frogs in tackles - becoming the first player in program history to do so for three consecutive seasons.  He was named first-team All-Big 12 in both seasons and again earned Defensive MVP honors in his final collegiate game, a win over Stanford in the 2017 Alamo Bowl.

College statistics

Professional career

Howard was drafted by the Los Angeles Rams in the seventh round (231st overall) of the 2018 NFL Draft. He was waived by the Rams on September 1, 2018. He was re-signed to the practice squad on October 16, 2018. He signed a reserve/future contract with the Rams on February 6, 2019.

On September 5, 2020, Howard was placed on injured reserve. He was given an exclusive-rights free agent tender by the Rams on March 4, 2021, and signed it on March 26.

On November 2, 2021, Howard was placed on injured reserve. He was activated on December 21.

Against the San Francisco 49ers in the NFC Championship Game, Howard made the game-sealing interception on Jimmy Garoppolo in the final two minutes in the 20-17 win, sending the Rams to Super Bowl LVI. The Rams went to beat the Cincinnati Bengals 23-20.

On June 8, 2022, Howard was waived by the Rams, but was then re-signed less than a week later He was placed on the reserve/non-football injury list on August 30, 2022. He was designated to return from the reserve/non-football injury list on October 24, 2022. He was activated from the reserve/non-football injury list on November 5, 2022.

References

External links
TCU Horned Frogs bio

1996 births
Living people
American football linebackers
American football safeties
Los Angeles Rams players
People from Longview, Texas
Players of American football from Texas
TCU Horned Frogs football players